William Christopher Chambers  (September 5, 1888 – March 27, 1962) was a professional baseball pitcher who played in one Major League game for the St. Louis Cardinals on July 11, 1910, pitching one inning, and allowing one unearned run.

External links

1888 births
1962 deaths
Major League Baseball pitchers
Baseball players from West Virginia
St. Louis Cardinals players
Flint Vehicles players
Marshall Thundering Herd baseball coaches